Forsyth Country Day School (FCDS) is a coeducational private day school located in Lewisville, North Carolina. FCDS was established in 1970.

Accreditation
FCDS is accredited by the Southern Association of Independent Schools (SAIS) and the Southern Association of Colleges and Schools (SACS).

Athletics

FCDS athletic teams are nicknamed the Furies and compete in the Piedmont Triad Athletic Conference (PTAC) and the North Carolina Independent Schools Athletic Association (NCISAA).

Notable alumni
 Kathleen Baker  100 meter backstroke swimmer who represented the United States in the 2016 Summer Olympics
 Tanner Beason  Major League Soccer (MLS) player
 Cal Cunningham  American politician, lawyer, and veteran
 Austin Dillon  NASCAR Cup Series driver
 Ty Dillon  NASCAR Cup Series driver; younger brother of Austin Dillon
 MacKenzie Mauzy  actress
 Ian Nelson  actor
 Matt Spear  former college soccer coach and current president of the Richmond Kickers
 Wells Thompson  professional soccer player

References 

Private high schools in North Carolina
Private middle schools in North Carolina
Private elementary schools in North Carolina
Schools in Forsyth County, North Carolina
Educational institutions established in 1970
Segregation academies in North Carolina
1970 establishments in North Carolina